"Chuck Versus the Best Friend" is the fourteenth episode of the second season of Chuck. It originally aired on February 23, 2009. When Chuck Bartowski flashes on Anna Wu's new boyfriend, Chuck is ordered to befriend Jason Wang (Jack Yang) to determine the extent of his connections with the Triad. After Morgan Grimes is caught snooping around, Chuck must convince the Triad that Morgan is not a threat, just a loser stalking Anna. Morgan, not knowing how close to death he just came, is hurt by Chuck's actions.

Plot

Main plot
A young Morgan Grimes (Andy Pessoa) is punched by a girl named Suzie for spying on her while in the gymnasium. A young Chuck Bartowski saves Morgan from a further beating. He advises Morgan to stay away from girls for at least 15 years.

In present day, approximately 15 years later, Morgan shows his friends at the Buy More a picture of his ex-girlfriend Anna Wu. Morgan suspects that Anna is seeing another man, and he wants his friends, including Chuck, to spy on her to learn more about her new boyfriend. Chuck refuses to stalk Anna, but Morgan insists that he still cares about her. Chuck and the "spy crew" follow Anna to a restaurant where she is waiting for her new boyfriend. Meanwhile, John Casey and Sarah Walker follow Chuck to learn what is he doing. A man (Jack Yang) arrives and greets Anna with a long kiss that Chuck and his friends can see perfectly from the van. Chuck flashes on the man's car and learns that his name is Jason Wang.

Chuck and the rest of his team arrive at Castle. As they wait for General Beckman (Bonita Friedericy) to contact them about the Jason Wang situation, Chuck asks about the canisters that are lying around. His handlers explain that one could release a substance that can melt iron, while the other releases a peppermint knockout spray. Chuck requests the latter, as he is always vulnerable in the field. Beckman appears and reveals that, though Wang has no criminal record, he is associating with a group of Triads who have been smuggling guns and drugs in and out of Los Angeles. To learn what Wang is doing, Chuck will have to use his social connection with Anna to get close. However, Chuck dislikes the idea of betraying Morgan.

Chuck discusses the plan with Sarah and Casey, but he is not totally convinced to betray his best friend. Casey backs him up with the Marine motto "Semper fidelis" (Always Faithful); However, he points out that orders come before loyalty. Meanwhile, Morgan asks Anna about the last night, but she avoids him, before finally telling him about her new boyfriend. Just when Morgan starts asking too many questions, Chuck enters and saves Morgan from embarrassment. Morgan leaves his friend with Anna and Chuck takes the opportunity to ask her for a double date with Sarah and her new boyfriend, due to Casey's prodding. She happily invites them to a party Jason is throwing that very evening.

Chuck discusses the plan with Sarah and Casey, and they decide that Sarah and Chuck will infiltrate the party as a couple. While Chuck tries to flash on anything useful, Sarah will plant a bug to monitor their movements. Chuck creates a sub-mission to convince Anna of what she is missing without Morgan. Chuck and Sarah enter the party, which is revealed to be an auto auction. They meet Anna right away and while Sarah continues the mission, Chuck starts trying to convince Anna to rekindle her relationship with Morgan. Jason then arrives and Anna introduces him to Sarah and Chuck. Meanwhile, Morgan spies on Anna from outside the building and discovers his best friend shaking hands with his ex-girlfriend's new boyfriend.

Chuck flashes on the many Triad members at the auction, but Sarah gets involved with Anna in a conversation, so Chuck has to continue the mission on his own. He follows the Triad members to a garage nearby and hears them talking about a shipment. Sarah talks with Anna about Morgan, and Anna is not sure about Jason, so Sarah takes advantage of it and talks her into returning to Morgan. Security guards receive an intruder code, leading Sarah and Casey to believe that Chuck was caught. However, the Triads bring in Morgan. Chuck runs to save his best friend's life, but in doing so he humiliates him in front of Anna and Jason, convincing everyone that Morgan is just a stalker. Morgan is spared, but the Triad discovers the bug Chuck planted at the garage, and they believe that Morgan really is a spy.

At the Buy More, Chuck tries to convince Morgan that he saved his life, but he cannot explain without compromising his cover. Chuck explains to Sarah that Morgan is more than a friend: he is part of the family. Sarah tells him that if they do not know the contents of the Triad shipment, everyone's best friend will be hurt.

Meanwhile, Triad enters the Buy More looking for Morgan, so Chuck incapacitates Morgan with the knockout spray and puts him in a large home theater box to sneak him out of the store. Anna stops Chuck to point out an interview with Jason on TV. Chuck flashes on a Rolls-Royce purchased by Mei Sheng (James Kiriyama-Lem), the ambassador to China. Chuck alerts Casey and Sarah that the ambassador is going to be killed. Chuck returns to Morgan, only to find that the Triad has taken the box and put it in a van.

Sarah, Casey, and Chuck drive to the car showroom to alert the ambassador of the plot to kill him. Chuck sees the van that the Triad members used to kidnap Morgan. Chuck follows the Triad members and watches them put Morgan in the trunk of the ambassador's car. Chuck flashes on the Rolls' hood ornament and realizes that the Triads are planning on blowing up the car. He alerts Sarah and Casey of the plot. Sarah goes to look for the bomb, while Casey goes after Chuck. Meanwhile, Chuck drives up in the Herder to warn the ambassador, who presumes that Chuck is a Triad member and drives away. As Chuck chases the ambassador's car, Casey sees, jumps onto, and clings to the Herder's roof. Chuck refuses to let Casey inside the Herder, knowing that he would focus on the ambassador instead of Morgan. Casey agrees to help save Morgan. As soon as Casey rappels inside, he removes a remote control from the glove box and uses it to catch up with the ambassador. When the ambassador's car stops, Casey exits, but the guards do not believe that he is in the NSA and push him to the ground.

Chuck removes the bomb from the ambassador's car and goes into the Herder with the bomb. After incapacitating the Triad leader "Smooth" Lau (Jennifer Jalene) by slamming her head against the car's steering wheel until the airbag is triggered, Sarah uses her CIA credentials to release Casey. She sees the Herder driving a short distance away before exploding. Sarah and Casey stare in disbelief and horror at the thought that Chuck just sacrificed himself, but Chuck reveals that he just used the remote control to drive it away.

Chuck opens the trunk of the Rolls-Royce, takes Morgan's snoring body back to the Buy More and explains that he fainted. Morgan apologizes to Chuck for his attitude, and they make peace. Sarah, Casey and Chuck learn from Beckman that the whole Triad group was taken into custody, including Jason. The ambassador is left with a renewed vigor to crack down on Triad activities in the United States and overseas. Beckman excuses herself to attend to other plans, drinking with Dr. Condoleezza Rice, revealing that even she has friends.

Sarah apologizes to Chuck for being insensitive about his bond with Morgan, admitting that she has no one in her life to care for her. Chuck insists that she does and holds her hand. As Toto's song "Africa" plays throughout the whole store (see Ellie, Devon, and Jeffster!), Morgan talks to Anna about his feelings, and she takes him back with a kiss.

Ellie, Devon, and Jeffster!
Ellie Bartowski and her fiance Devon Woodcomb discuss their wedding plans. She asks him to help her with the items on her "To-Do" list, and he agrees to help her with the flowers, the music, and the wedding cake. Devon asks Chuck to help him find the band. Jeff Barnes and Lester Patel, the titular members of the band Jeffster!, learn that Chuck is looking for a band to hire for his sister's wedding. They tell Chuck that they would love to play at the wedding, but Chuck declines without hesitation.

Later, the Nerd Herd receives an urgent call from Ellie. She has a computer emergency and wants Chuck to fix it, but he is unavailable. Luckily for her, Jeff and Lester want an opportunity to audition to play at Ellie's wedding, so they take the call and go to fix the computer. After they finish working, they move things around to set up their audition, but Lester nervously leaves at the last minute.

Jeff later asks Chuck about the impression they made at Ellie's house, but Chuck knows nothing. Jeff goes to Ellie's apartment for another audition, and Devon agrees. Ellie and Devon politely arrive at the Buy More to watch Jeffster!, though they deny any possibility of actually hiring the band. The band starts play the song "Africa" and the music invades the whole store.

Production
"Chuck Versus the Best Friend" was produced before "Chuck Versus the Suburbs", but the airing order was swapped in the United States due to the former being preempted for a presidential speech. As "Chuck Versus the Suburbs" has a Valentine's Day theme, it was aired on its intended date in the week of Valentine's Day. "Chuck Versus the Best Friend", however, continues plot points introduced in "Chuck Versus Santa Claus", with Morgan believing that Anna is unfaithful to him. This resulted in a continuity error, as Morgan remarks in "Chuck Versus the Suburbs" that he and Chuck have girlfriends for the holiday, yet he and Anna have broken up by the next episode.

The episode revealed that Jeff and Lester had a band, Jeffster!, a recurring plot point throughout the rest of the series.

Flashes
Chuck flashes on Jason Wang while spying on Anna.
Chuck flashes on the triad members at the car auction.
Chuck flashes on the Rolls-Royce from the news report.

Cultural references
 Jeff persuades Lester to participate in the audition by reciting the opening lines of Eminem's song "Lose Yourself".
 Jeffster performs a cover of Toto's hit single "Africa" at the episode's close.

Reception 
"Chuck Versus the Best Friend" received positive reviews from critics. Steve Heisler of The A.V. Club gave the episode an A−, calling it "incredibly enjoyable" and enjoying Anna's return from a two-episode absence. Heisler concluded, "My only major complaint: Will they ever end an episode without Sarah and Chuck longingly glancing at each other, silently wishing for the quiet, datey life they can never achieve?"

Eric Goldman of IGN gave the episode a 9.4 out of 10, writing, "This was a highly entertaining episode of Chuck, which did a great job of making use of almost the entire cast in fun and inventive ways... Even though Chuck maintains a primarily humorous tone, the show continues to do an excellent job at keeping the relationships feeling genuine, even in the midst of some very heightened situations." Goldman called Sarah's fight scene "simultaneously the most violent and sexiest one yet on this series."

The episode drew 6.592 million viewers, the lowest number up to that point.

References

External links
 

Best Friend
2009 American television episodes
Triad (organized crime)